The Maharashtra Cricket Association (Marathi: महाराष्ट्र क्रिकेट संघटणा) is the governing body of the cricket activities in the Maharashtra state of India and the Maharashtra cricket team. It is affiliated to the Board of Control for Cricket in India.

Maharashtra cricket association's team represents Maharashtra state in domestic cricket competitions of BCCI such as Ranji trophy, Vijay Hazare trophy etc. The association have international standards Cricket stadium, a Test cricket venue at Gahunje village near Pune in Maharashtra, India. 

Maharashtra state's district Cricket associations are afflicted to this board. 

Its headquarters is located into the MCA stadium, Pune.

History 
MCA use to organise international cricket matches at Neharu stadium before building its cricket stadium. 

In 2012 MCA inaugurated its own international standards cricket stadium,  Maharashtra Cricket Association Stadium. The arena's sitting capacity is 55,000.

Team  

This board's team represent Maharashtra in domestic cricket championships such as Ranji trophy, Vijay Hazare trophy etc.  This team plays its home matches at MCA stadium, Pune.

Stadium  

MCA's stadium is situated in Gahunje village near Pune. It was inaugurated by then BCCI president Sharad Pawar. International, domestic cricket matches regularly takes place at MCA stadium. The arena was designed by Hopkins Architects of Britain. It is one of the test cricket venues of the country.

Affiliated district associations 
The district Cricket associations which are affiliated to the Maharashtra Cricket association are as follows.

 Dhule district Cricket association
 Nasik district Cricket association
 Jalgaon district Cricket association
 Pune district Cricket association
 Nashik district Cricket association
 Kolhapur district Cricket association
Nandurbar district Cricket association
Aurangabad district Cricket association
Ahemadnagar district Cricket association
 Hingoli district Cricket association
 Satara district Cricket association
 Jalna district Cricket association
 Sangli district Cricket association
 Latur district Cricket association
 Beed district Cricket association
 Solapur district Cricket association
 Osmanabad district Cricket association
 Raigad district Cricket association
 Ratnagiri district Cricket association
 Parbhani district Cricket association

References

Cricket administration in India
Cricket in Maharashtra
Sport in Maharashtra
Sports organizations established in 1953
Sports governing bodies in India
1953 establishments in Bombay State
Members of the Board of Control for Cricket in India 
Category : Pune district